Tymofiy Sukhar (born 4 February 1999) is a professional Ukrainian football defender who plays for FC Petržalka.

Career
Sukhar is a product of the UFK Dnipropetrovsk and FC Dnipro Youth Sportive School systems. His first trainers were Volodymyr Herashchenko and Kostyantyn Pavlyuchenko.

He never made his debut for FC Dnipro in the Ukrainian Premier League and in summer 2017 signed a contract with the new created Ukrainian Second League's club SC Dnipro-1.

In February 2018 he joined Ukrainian Premier League side Zorya Luhansk and signed 3-year contract with the club.

Personal life
His father Yuriy Sukhar was also a footballer, who played in the amateur level.

References

External links
 
 

1999 births
Living people
Ukrainian footballers
Ukrainian expatriate footballers
FC Dnipro players
SC Dnipro-1 players
FC Zorya Luhansk players
FC Metalurh Zaporizhzhia players
FC VPK-Ahro Shevchenkivka players
FC Petržalka players
FC Skoruk Tomakivka players
Ukrainian First League players
Ukrainian Second League players
2. Liga (Slovakia) players
Expatriate footballers in Slovakia
Ukrainian expatriate sportspeople in Slovakia
Association football defenders
Sportspeople from Kherson Oblast